Class 27 were the first of the Belgian Railways' large 1980s family of 144 electric locomotives. The family was made up of Classes 11 (12), 12 (12), 21 (60) and 27 (60). Classes 11, 12 and 21 were nearly twice as powerful as the preceding classes 22, 23 and 25. Class 27 was more than twice as powerful as these 1950s locomotives. The family was heavily influenced by the Class 202 locomotives built in the mid 1970s. They are very reliable because of the trial and error development of their predecessors. This family came into service with M4 and M5 coaching stock and the AM 80 and AM 86 series of EMUs. This generation was a major modernisation even if the older M2 coaching stock remained active for more than a decade. These four sister classes are visually identical except for a few minor details. Class 11's livery was specific to the Benelux service, which they operated for most of their service lives.

Class 27 locomotives are the staple power for SNCB/NMBS. They work all over the 3000 volt electrified lines including the occasional trip through to Luxembourg City. The arrival of Class 13 had little impact on Class 27 at the time as the 13s were occupied with trains of I11 coaching stock and goods trains working on newly electrified sections under 25,000 volts, 50 Hz, where Class 27s could not go. Class 27s were frequently engaged in pulling heavy freights from the Flemish ports to the sorting yard at Montzen, near the German border. They also pulled a number of passenger services including peak hour trains of M5 double deck coaching stock. They have become very active on trains with the newer M6 stock. Locos 2742 to 2760 have been modified with MUX and automatic couplers at one end so they can work in multiple in push-pull trains made up of two Class 27s each with a rake of five M6 coaches running one behind the other. The trains start at separate destinations and join up later to run together as a unit over most of their route. Later they split up and go their separate ways to their final destinations and reverse for the return journey. These locos have been showing frame wear because they were not originally designed for this kind of service so SNCB is monitoring them closely. These MUX locomotives have been replaced on freight duties by Class 13, which have lost most of their passenger duties.

Locomotive 2711 currently holds the world record for the longest passenger train ever pulled by a single locomotive. The record was set on 27 April 1991, when the locomotive pulled 70 carriages from Gent to Oostende.

References

External links 
 HLE 27

3000 V DC locomotives
National Railway Company of Belgium locomotives
Electric locomotives of Belgium
Railway locomotives introduced in 1981
La Brugeoise et Nivelles locomotives
Standard gauge locomotives of Belgium